Namalbarh is a small village in Bhogpur (Purba Medinipur), Gram panchayat, in the Kolaghat block of the Tamluk sub-division in the district of Purba Medinipur in the West Bengal state. The nearest railway station is Bhogpur railway station.

Villages in Purba Medinipur district